Jvari may refer to the following in the country of Georgia:

 Jvari (town), a town in Georgia
 Jvari (monastery), an ancient monastery in Georgia
 Jvari inscriptions, Georgian inscriptions